The Panman: Rhythm of the Palms is a 2007 film that tells the story of the rise and fall of the steel drum pan player Harry Daniel. Daniel is an icon of the Caribbean whose personal life suffers when he places his music above his family. For he is desperate to pass the pan culture to a younger generation. During this crusade to keep the music alive on his beloved island of St Martin, he meets the exceptionally talented Jacko, who becomes his star apprentice and hope for the future. Harry treats him like the son he never had. However, when Harry's fame begins to diminish, Jacko turns against him and embraces instead the world of rock music. But when Harry dies unexpectedly, Jacko returns to his island culture to become pan music's brilliant new icon.

Since its December 2007 red-carpet premiere in St. Maarten, Panman has been screened elsewhere in the region and is on the line-up for film festivals in the UK, North America, Europe, South Africa and Australia. It was also shown at the Curaçao film festival and at Carifesta in Guyana and had a grand premiere in the Netherlands September 2008.

The film has picked up two awards, winning the best feature film at the Hollywood Black Film Festival and Best Score at the Brooklyn International Film Festival, both in June 2008.

Panman is based on Ian Valz's play Rhythm of the Palms, first produced in 1991. The film is the debut feature of Dutch director Sandy Burger and is co-produced by scriptwriter Norman de Palm.

The Panman: Rhythm of the Palms is St. Maarten's first locally produced feature film; most of Panman’s cast are home-grown actors, most of them introduced to the stage and groomed by Valz himself.

On April 28, 2010, Valz died of cancer at St. Maarten Medical Center.

Awards 
 2008 Brooklyn International Film Festival (Brooklyn, NY) — Winner, Best Original Score Award (Jury).
 2008 Hollywood Black Film Festival (Hollywood, CA) — Winner, Best Feature Film Award (Jury).

External links 
 

2007 films
2000s English-language films